William Peter Popp (June 7, 1877 – September 5, 1909) was a Major League Baseball pitcher who played for the St. Louis Cardinals in 1902. He later was a manager in the minor leagues in 1904.

External links

1877 births
1909 deaths
Major League Baseball pitchers
St. Louis Cardinals players
Baseball players from Missouri
Minor league baseball managers
Little Rock Travelers players
Toledo Swamp Angels players
Columbus Senators players
Terre Haute Hottentots players